Pipe Creek is an unincorporated community in Bandera County, Texas, United States. According to the Handbook of Texas, it had a population of approximately 66 in 1990. It is part of the San Antonio Metropolitan Statistical Area.

History
A post office called Pipe Creek has been in operation since 1873. The community was named from Pipe Creek and was founded around 1870. Francis Marion Hodges was the first settler in the community in 1868. Oliver S. Shirley then settled two years later. Seventy more families moved to the area during the first decade of the town's development. Surnames of local settlers included Scott, Anderson, Newcomer, Vawter, and Morgenstern. A.M. Beekman was the first postmaster in the community. Its post office's name was changed to Pipecreek for a small amount of time in 1895. Francis Marion Hodges' wife opened the community's first store in the 1870s and another was opened by W.J. Hamilton. A cotton gin and a gristmill operated in Pipe Creek by the early 1880s and served 100 residents. Locals were mostly farmers and ranchers, who raised cotton, corn, cattle, sheep, and produced molasses. Travel and mail delivery were provided by stagecoaches from San Antonio to Bandera. A First Baptist congregation was established in the community in 1886. Pipe Creek's population was estimated to be 100 during the start of the 20th century. A Methodist church was then established in 1904, with a telephone line being installed in the community's general store four years later. The population declined to 25 by the 1920s. It then increased to 150 when electric service was installed there in 1941. It continued to jump to 220 in the 1950s and 60s when several subdivisions were built in the vicinity. One source says there were about 25 subdivisions in the community. The population then plunged to 66 by the 1970s and remained at that level through 1990. The eaarly part of that decade saw construction, auto, and real estate businesses being establishedd, as well as a restaurant, a hardware store, a community center, and several churches. Many residents commuted to Bandera and San Antonio for work. There is a Texas Historical Marker in the community noting the English-Cristda house, a lodging stop for people who traveled there in the late 1800s and early 1900s.

The American Goat Society is headquartered in the community.

Geography

Other notable places located in Pipe Creek include churches, the public library, and parts of the Bandera Falls residential community. Large portions of the area are accessed from FM1283.

Education
Pipe Creek's first school was built in 1881 near the local cemetery. The First Baptist, other Baptist, and other denominations held church services at the schoolhouse in 1886. Another school named Deskin School was established in 1913 and consolidated with the one in Pipe Creek in 1924. Another school was built in 1948 and consolidated with the Bandera ISD two years later.

The Bandera Independent School District serves area students. The Bandera Independent School District also consists of both private and public schools. Pipe Creek is also served by the Northside Independent School District in San Antonio, Texas. Two local schools include Hill Country Elementary School and Pipe Creek Christian School.

References

Unincorporated communities in Bandera County, Texas
Greater San Antonio
Unincorporated communities in Texas